Martha B. Hudson (later Pennyman, born March 21, 1939) is a retired American sprinter. She won a gold medal in the 4 × 100 m relay at the 1960 Olympics, but failed to reach the final of the individual 100 m event. In 1959 she held the AAU indoor 100 yd title. In 1986 she was inducted into the Georgia Sports Hall of Fame.

References

1939 births
American female sprinters
Tennessee State Lady Tigers track and field athletes
Athletes (track and field) at the 1960 Summer Olympics
Olympic gold medalists for the United States in track and field
Living people
People from Thomaston, Georgia
People from Eastman, Georgia
Medalists at the 1960 Summer Olympics
Olympic female sprinters
20th-century American women